"Blow My Mind" is a song by American-born Nigerian singer Davido featuring American R&B singer Chris Brown. It was released on 26 July 2019 as the fourth single from Davido's album A Good Time. The song incorporates tribal sounds of African music.

The song's video achieved notable views in its first 24 hours and achieved 10 million views within three weeks. The song went 2× Platinum in South Africa, selling over 40,000 copies. It peaked at No. 3 on Billboards Top Triller Global Chart on 9 August 2019.

"Blow My Mind" was nominated for Best Collaboration at the Africa Entertainment Awards USA 2020.

Chart performance

Certifications

References

2019 singles
2019 songs
Davido songs
Chris Brown songs
Songs written by Chris Brown
Song recordings produced by Shizzi
Nigerian afropop songs
Songs written by Davido